Hallo Taxi  is a German television series.

See also
List of German television series

External links
 

2008 German television series debuts
2008 German television series endings
German-language television shows
RTL (German TV channel) original programming